Merzomyia is a genus of tephritid  or fruit flies in the family Tephritidae.

Species
Merzomyia licenti (Chen, 1938)
Merzomyia mongolica (Korneyev, 1990)
Merzomyia westermanni (Meigen, 1826)

References

Tephritinae
Tephritidae genera
Diptera of Asia
Diptera of Europe